Cold Song may refer to:
"What Power Art Thou?", informally also known as "The Cold Song", an aria from the 17th-century opera King Arthur
 "The Cold Song", a track from the 1981 album Klaus Nomi based on the aria
 "Cold Song", a track from the 1995 album Pieces of You
 "Cold Song", a 1996 single by German house music project Whirlpool Productions
 "Cold Song", a 2013 single by Arielle Dombasle
 "Cold Song", a track from the 2018 rock album Generation Rx and its early working title
 "Cold Song", a track from the 2021 album Beacon
 The Cold Song, a 2011 novel by Linn Ullmann

See also 
 
 Winter Song (disambiguation)